Ugo Pirro (April 20, 1920 – January 18, 2008) was an Italian screenwriter and novelist.

Biography
Born Ugo Mattone in Battipaglia, near Salerno, he debuted as screenwriter for director Carlo Lizzani (Achtung! Banditi!,  1951, and Il gobbo, 1960).

His screenplays of the 1970s include films Indagine su un cittadino al di sopra di ogni sospetto and Il giardino dei Finzi-Contini, which both won Academy Awards as Best Foreign Film.

Pirro was also a literature author, his most notable works being Le soldatesse (1956), set in the Italian occupation of Greece during World War II, and Celluloide, adapted for cinema by Lizzani in 1996.

Pirro died in Rome in 2008.

Works

Films
Achtung! Banditi! (1951)
Il sole negli occhi (1953)
 Songs of Italy (1955)
Uomini e lupi (1956)
L'amore più bello (1957)
Il momento più bello (1957)
Cerasella (1959)
Il gobbo (1960)
La garçonnière (1960)
5 Branded Women (1960)
La guerra continua (1962)
Il processo di Verona (1963)
Le soldatesse (1965)
Svegliati e uccidi (1966)
Navajo Joe (1966)
A ciascuno il suo (1967)
L'occhio selvaggio (1967)
Sardinia Kidnapped (1968)
Il giorno della civetta (1968)
L'amante di Gramigna (1969)
Bitka na Neretvi (1969)
Metello (1970)
Indagine su un cittadino al di sopra di ogni sospetto (1970)
Il giardino dei Finzi-Contini (1970)
La classe operaia va in paradiso (1971)
Imputazione di omicidio per uno studente (1972)
Il generale dorme in piedi (1972)
Days of Fury (1973)
La proprietà non è più un furto (1973)
Sutjeska (1973)
Delitto d'amore (1974)
I guappi (1974)
Paolo Barca, maestro elementare, praticamente nudista (1975)
Colpita da improvviso benessere (1975)
San Babila ore 20 un delitto inutile (1976)
L'eredità Ferramonti (1976)
Il prefetto di ferro (1977)
Signore e signori, buonanotte (1978)
Enfantasme (1978)
Povratak (1979)
Operación Ogro (1979)
Cronaca nera (1987)
Un ragazzo di Calabria (1987)
Obbligo di giocare - Zugzwang (1990)
Funes, un gran amor (1993)
Il giudice ragazzino (1994)
Celluloide (1996)
Ninfa plebea (1996)

Television
Nucleo zero (1984)
Mio figlio non sa leggere (1984)
Gioco di società (1989)
Piazza di Spagna (1993)
La famiglia Ricordi (1993)
Il prezzo del denaro (1995)

Novels
Le soldatesse (1956)
Mille tradimenti (1959)
Jovanka e le altre (1960)
Mio figlio non sa leggere (1981)
Il luogo dei delitti (1991)
Osteria dei pittori (1994)
Celluloide (1995)
Soltanto un nome sui titoli di testa (1998)
Figli di ferroviere (1999)
Per scrivere un film (2001)
Il cinema della nostra vita (2001)

References

External links

1920 births
2008 deaths
People from Battipaglia
20th-century Italian screenwriters
Italian male screenwriters
Italian male novelists
David di Donatello winners
20th-century Italian male writers